Robson is an unincorporated community in Fayette County, West Virginia, United States, situated primarily on the banks of Loup Creek. Robson's Post Office serves the smaller communities of Beards Fork and Mulberry.

The community was named after James Robson, an early settler.

References

Unincorporated communities in Fayette County, West Virginia
Unincorporated communities in West Virginia